Mondial Relay was a France-based international package delivery company founded in 1997. The company operates 4 hubs in France (in Hem, Saint-Priest, Saran, and Cestas) and another 6 abroad, operating in 15 countries. In the 12 months up to March 2021 the company handled 140 million packages. In 2021 Otto Group sold Mondial Relay for €565 million to InPost, a Polish package delivery company.

References 

Logistics companies of France
French companies established in 1997
Transport companies established in 1997